Øyingen or Store Øyingen is a lake in the municipality of Snåsa in Trøndelag county, Norway.  The  lake lies just outside the border of the Blåfjella–Skjækerfjella National Park.  The lake Grøningen lies to the southeast and the lake Andorsjøen lies to the northeast.

See also
List of lakes in Norway

References

Snåsa
Lakes of Trøndelag